Parramatta is a suburb in Western Sydney, Australia.

Parramatta may also refer to:

Places in Australia 
City of Parramatta, local government area
Division of Parramatta, Australian federal electoral district
Electoral district of Parramatta, New South Wales state electoral district
Lake Parramatta, a man-made reservoir near Parramatta in New South Wales, Australia
 North Parramatta, a suburb of Sydney, New South Wales
Parramatta ferry wharf, for RiverCat services, Sydney, Australia
Parramatta Park (disambiguation)
Parramatta railway station, on the Western, Blue Mountains and Cumberland lines, Sydney, Australia
Parramatta River, an estuary in Sydney, New South Wales, Australia
Westfield Parramatta, a shopping complex in Parramatta, New South Wales, Australia

Sports 
Parramatta Power, National Soccer League club
Parramatta Eels, Rugby League Football club
Parramatta Stadium, a sports stadium in Parramatta, New South Wales, Australia

Transportation 
HMAS Parramatta, a list of Royal Australian Navy ships that share the name
Parramatta (ship), ships with the name Parramatta
 Parramatta (1866), a Scottish sailing ship that operated between Great Britain and Australia and America, 1866–1898

Other uses 
Target-marking technique used by Pathfinder, during WW II
 Paramatta (moth), a snout moth genus in tribe Phycitini
 Parramatta cloth, a tweed cloth of the early 19th century

See also
 
Paramatta (disambiguation)